Demerara is a historical region in the Guianas, on the north coast of South America, now part of the country of Guyana. It was a colony of the Dutch West India Company between 1745 and 1792 and a colony of the Dutch state from 1792 until 1815. It was merged with Essequibo in 1812 by the British who took control. It formally became a British colony in 1815 till Demerara-Essequibo was merged with Berbice to form the colony of British Guiana in 1831. In 1838, it became a county of British Guiana till 1958. In 1966, British Guiana gained independence as Guyana and in 1970 it became a republic as the Co-operative Republic of Guyana. It was located around the lower course of the Demerara River, and its main settlement was Georgetown.

The name "Demerara" comes from a variant of the Arawak word "Immenary" or "Dumaruni", which means "river of the letter wood" (wood of Brosimum guianense tree). Demerara sugar is so named because originally, it came from sugarcane fields in the colony of Demerara.

History
Demerara was first mentioned in 1691 as a trading post. On 18 October 1745, Demerara was created as a separate colony, even though it was located on an unoccupied part of Essequibo, because the people from the province of Holland wanted to settle there and Essequibo was part of Zeeland. In the founding documents, it was mentioned that the colonists should live in peace with the Amerindian population and respect their territories, because they fought with the colony of Essequibo against the French privateers and helped to chase them off. The Amerindian were considered free people, and they were not allowed to enslave them.

The first planter was Andries Pieterse who already owned a plantation in Essequibo. Half a year later, there were 18 large sugar plantations and 50 smaller plantations. The colony was initially governed from Fort Zeelandia by Laurens Storm van 's Gravesande, the governor of Essequibo. In 1750 he appointed his son Jonathan as Commander of Demerara. 

Demerara grew rapidly, and attracted many English planters. The Dutch West India Company, who had a monopoly on the slave trade, was unable to supply them, leading to illegal smuggling from English colonies. 

In 1755, Gedney Clarke, a Barbados merchant and plantation owner, requested political representation, therefore the administration was moved to the island of Borsselen,  upriver near plantation Soesdyke which was owned by the commander of Demerara. The decision was criticised because the island was hard to defend, and the planters had started to build houses around the guard post near the mouth of the river. That settlement later became known as Stabroek, and in 1782 the capital of the colony. The town was renamed Georgetown in 1812.

In 1763, a slave uprising took place in neighbouring Berbice. Governor van 's Gravesande formed an alliance with the Amerindian Arawak, Kalina, Warao and Akawaio tribes, and prevented the uprising from spreading to Demerara and Essequibo. 50 soldiers from Demarara were sent to Berbice as assistance. The slave uprisings were source of concern: in a 1767 letter to Frederick the Great, the King of Prussia, which aimed to promote the colony for German planters, a request was added for 100 soldiers.

In 1780, there were almost 200 plantations in Demerara compared to 129 in Essequibo. Demerara had become more successful than Essequibo. The rivalry between the colonies resulted in the creation of a combined Court of Policy in Fort Zeelandia. The majority of the white population of the colony were English and Scottish planters.

Conquest and reconquest
In 1781, the American revolution induced the Dutch Republic to join with the Bourbon side against the British, a large fleet under Admiral Lord Rodney's command was sent to the West Indies, and after having made some seizures in the Caribbean Islands, a squadron was detached to take possession of the colonies of Essequibo and Demerara, which was accomplished without even a fight. The previous year, the colony produced 10,000 hogsheads of sugar, 5,000,000 pounds coffee and 800,000 pounds cotton. 

In 1782 the French took possession of the whole of the Dutch settlements, compelling Gov. Robert Kingston to surrender. The opinion of the Dutch newspapers varied. The Leeuwarder Courant called it the loss of our Demerary, while the Hollandsche historische courant described it as a pleasant reconquest. The peace of Paris, which occurred in 1783, restored these territories to the Dutch. 

The British recaptured Demerara, Essequibo, and Berbice in 1796. A deal was struck with the colony: all laws and customs could remain, and the citizens were equal to British subjects. Any government official who swore loyalty to the British crown could remain in function. They returned the colony to the Dutch in 1802 under the terms of the Peace of Amiens, but re-took control of it a year later.

On 28 April 1812, the British combined the colonies of Demerara and Essequibo into the colony of Demerara-Essequibo. They were ceded to Britain on 13 August 1814. On 20 November 1815, the Netherlands ratified the agreement.

Slave rebellion

Large slave rebellions broke out in West Demerara in 1795 and on the East Coast of Demerara in 1823. Although these rebellions were easily and bloodily crushed, according to Winston McGowan, they may have had a long-term impact in ending slavery:

Dissolution
On 21 July 1831, Demerara-Essequibo united with Berbice as British Guiana, now Guyana. In 1838, Demerara was made one of the three counties of Guiana, the other two being Berbice and Essequibo. In 1958, the county was abolished when Guiana was subdivided into districts. Historical Demerara was divided in 1958 and are a part of Guyanese administrative regions of Demerara-Mahaica, Essequibo Islands-West Demerara, and Upper Demerara-Berbice.

Notable Demerarans

Sir James Douglas (1803–1877), Governor of the Colony of Vancouver Island (1851–64) and the Colony of British Columbia (1858–64).
Rev. Joseph Ketley (1802–1875), Congregational missionary, mid 19th century.
John Edmonstone (late 18th century–mid 19th century), a freed slave who taught Charles Darwin taxidermy.
Andrew Watson-first black person to play association football at international level.

Commanders of Demerara

Jonathan Samuel Storm van 's Gravesande (†1761) (1750–1761)
Laurens Lodewijk van Bercheijk (†1765) (1761–1765)
Jan Cornelis van den Heuvel (1765–1770)
Paulus van Schuylenburgh (1772–1781)
Antony Beaujon (22 April 1796 – 27 March 1802)

Governors of Demerara

Robert Kingston (27 February 1781 – 1782)
Louis Antoine Dazemard de Lusignan (1782)
Armand Guy Simon de Coëtnempren, comte de Kersaint (*1742 – †1793) (1782)
Georges Manganon de la Perrière (1783–1784)

Directors-general
Laurens Storm van 's Gravesande (1752–1772)
Joseph Bourda (acting) (6 March 1784 – February 1785)
Jan L'Éspinasse (February 1785 – 18 August 1789)
Albertus Backer (18 August 1789 – 31 March 1793)
Baron Willem August Sirtema van Grovestins (31 March 1793 – May 1795)
Antony Beaujon (May 1795 – 22 April 1796)
Antony Meertens (27 March 1802 – September 1803)

Lieutenant governors of Demerara and Essequibo

Robert Nicholson (September 1803 – 18 August 1804)
Antony Beaujon (18 August 1804 – 17 October 1805)
James Montgomery (acting) (19 October 1805 – 8 May 1806)
Henry William Bentinck (*1765 – †1821) (8 May 1806 – February 1812)
Hugh Lyle Carmichael (*1764 – †1813) (February 1812 – 11 May 1813)
E. Codd (acting) (11 May 1813 – 23 May 1813)
John Murray (23 May 1813 – 26 April 1824)
Sir Benjamin d'Urban (26 April 1824 – 21 July 1831)

Leaders of rebellions
 1823: Jack Gladstone of Plantation Success
 1823: Quamina of Plantation Success

See also
 History of Guyana
 Banknotes of Demerary and Essequibo
 Pierre Louis de Saffon

References

Further reading
 da Costa, Emilia Viotti.  Crowns of Glory, Tears of Blood (1994). scholarly study of the   Demerara slave rebellion of 1823.

 Oostindie, Gert. "‘British Capital, Industry and Perseverance’ versus Dutch ‘Old School’? The Dutch Atlantic and the Takeover of Berbice, Demerara and Essequibo, 1750-1815" BMGN: Low Countries Historical Review (2012) 127#4 pp 28–55. 

 Sheridan, Richard B. "The condition of the slaves on the sugar plantations of Sir John Gladstone in the colony of Demerara, 1812-49." New West Indian Guide/Nieuwe West-Indische Gids 76#3-4 (2002): 243-269.
 St Pierre, Maurice. "The 1823 Guyana Slave Rebellion: A Collective Action Reconsideration." Journal of Caribbean History 41#1/2 (2007): 142.

Demerara